The 2017 season' of the Indian Premier League, also known as IPL 10  and branded as Vivo IPL 2017, was the tenth edition of the IPL, a professional Twenty20 cricket league established by the BCCI in 2007. The tournament featured the eight teams that played in the previous season. The 2017 season started on 5 April 2017 and finished on 21 May 2017, with Hyderabad hosting the opening match and the final. Mumbai Indians won by 1 run against Rising Pune Supergiant in the final, winning their third title making them the first team to achieve the milestone. The tagline 'Dus saal aapke naam (10 years of IPL). This was the last time that Sony Television Network broadcast the tournament before Star Sports Network took the broadcasting rights from the 11th season and are currently bearing the broadcasting rights for the tournament.

Sunrisers Hyderabad captain David Warner won the Orange Cap for the leading run-scorer of the tournament with 641 runs. Bhuvneshwar Kumar, also of Sunrisers Hyderabad, was awarded the Purple Cap for finishing as the leading wicket-taker of the tournament with 26 wickets. Rising Pune Supergiant's Ben Stokes was named the Most Valuable Player, while Basil Thampi of Gujarat Lions was named the Emerging Player of the Tournament.

 Format 
Eight teams were contesting the season. The schedule for the tournament was published on 15 February 2017. The league stage, consisting of 56 matches, took place between 5 April and 14 May 2017. The top four teams qualified for the play-offs, with the final held in Hyderabad on 21 May.

 Venues 
Ten venues were selected to host the matches. The opening match and the final were played at the Rajiv Gandhi International Cricket Stadium in Hyderabad.

 Personnel changes 

The retention lists for the season were announced in December 2016. On 3 February, the BCCI announced that the player auction would be held on 20 February 2017 in Bangalore with a total of 799 players registered for it. On 14 February, the IPL Desk released a list of 351 players. Out of the 351 players shortlisted, 66 players were sold at the 2017 IPL Auction.

Opening ceremonies
Unlike the previous IPL seasons each of which had a single opening ceremony, the 2017 season featured opening ceremonies at each venue before the start of the first match at the venue. The ceremonies included performances by Amy Jackson (at Hyderabad); Shalmali Kholgade and Riteish Deshmukh (at Pune); Bhoomi Trivedi, Sachin–Jigar and Tiger Shroff (at Rajkot); Harshdeep Kaur and Disha Patani (at Indore); Benny Dayal and Kriti Sanon (at Bangalore); Sushant Singh Rajput and Malaika Arora (at Mumbai); Shillong Chamber Choir, Monali Thakur and Shraddha Kapoor (at Kolkata); Raftaar, Yami Gautam and Guru Randhawa (at Delhi).

Teams and standings

Points table

("C" refers to the "Champions" of the Tournament. 'R'(2nd Position), '3' and '4' are the positions of the respective teams in the tournament.)

 League progression

 League stage 

 Match results 

 All 10 RPS batsmen were out caught, the first time this occurred in the IPL

 All 10 Delhi Daredevil wickets were out caught

 Playoffs 

 Preliminary 
 
Qualifier 1

 
Eliminator

 
Qualifier 2

 Final 

 Statistics 

 Most runs 

  David Warner of Sunrisers Hyderabad received the Orange Cap.
 Source: Cricinfo

 Most wickets 

  Bhuvneshwar Kumar of Sunrisers Hyderabad received the Purple Cap.
 Source: Cricinfo

Special awards

 Source:'

See also
 List of Indian Premier League records and statistics

References

External links 
 Series home on ESPN Cricinfo

 
Indian Premier League seasons
India
Premier League